Dereza may refer to:

 Dereza, Požega-Slavonia County, a village in Požega-Slavonia County, Croatia
 Dereza, Bjelovar-Bilogora County, a village in Bjelovar-Bilogora County, Croatia
 Dereza (film), a 1985 Soviet animated musical film